Empresa Aerolineas Uruguay S.A. (also known as Aerolineas Uruguayas or Aero Uruguay) was an Uruguayan cargo airline company. It was based at Carrasco International Airport at Montevideo, Uruguay.

History
Aero Uruguay flew from 1977 to 2005.

Fleet

Aero Uruguay had a fleet mostly made up of jets, many of them formerly with Cargolux.

References

External links

Defunct airlines of Uruguay
Uruguayan brands
Airlines established in 1977
Airlines disestablished in 2005
Companies based in Montevideo